Muirdrum is a small village in the council area of Angus, Scotland. It is situated at the junction of the old A92 road from Dundee to Arbroath, the A930 to Carnoustie and B9128 to Forfar.

The village is mentioned in the list of lands purchased by George Maule, 2nd Earl of Panmure in 1667. These lands were forfeited by his heir, James Maule, 4th Earl of Panmure following the Jacobite rising of 1715. The opening of the Dundee to Arbroath turnpike road (later designated the A92 road) at the beginning of the 19th century lead to some expansion along this road.

See also 
 List of places in Angus
 Carnoustie

References

External links 

Villages in Angus, Scotland